Waiatarua is a small settlement near the top of the Waitākere Ranges in West Auckland, close to the junction of Scenic Drive, West Coast Road and Piha Road to Piha and runs east until the junction of Scenic Drive and Mountain Road.  Surrounded by native bush in the Centennial Memorial Park and the water catchment area, Waiatarua is over 300 metres above sea level and some houses are over 400 metres above sea level (higher than the Auckland Sky Tower). Waiatarua means “song of two waters”, possibly referring to the ability to see both the wild
west coast, and the still, sparkling waters of the Manukau and Waitemata harbours from certain points in the area.

History

The area is within the traditional rohe of Te Kawerau ā Maki, an iwi that traces their ancestry to some of the earliest inhabitants of the Auckland Region. The name Waiatarua originally referred to the upper reaches of the Big Muddy Creek and Nihotupu Stream, likely referencing the dual view of both the Waitematā and Manukau Harbours. During early European settlement, the area was interchangeably referred to as Waiatarua or Nihotupu. Waiatarua became the more popular name due to Scenic Drive resident Frederick Judson. Afterwards, the name Waiatarua was applied to a larger area.

Rose Hellaby House is a historic building transformed into a museum. Large Kauri trees were milled in Waiatarua at Mander and Bradley's Mill close to Upper Nihotupu reservoir. At the turn of the century, holidaymakers would travel by coach from Glen Eden to stay at the Waiatarua guest house.

Demographics

Waiatarua had a population of 2,148 at the 2018 New Zealand census, an increase of 72 people (3.5%) since the 2013 census, and an increase of 159 people (8.0%) since the 2006 census. There were 735 households, comprising 1,089 males and 1,062 females, giving a sex ratio of 1.03 males per female. The median age was 43.1 years (compared with 37.4 years nationally), with 387 people (18.0%) aged under 15 years, 360 (16.8%) aged 15 to 29, 1,098 (51.1%) aged 30 to 64, and 300 (14.0%) aged 65 or older.

Ethnicities were 88.4% European/Pākehā, 11.7% Māori, 5.0% Pacific peoples, 6.7% Asian, and 2.5% other ethnicities. People may identify with more than one ethnicity.

The percentage of people born overseas was 25.4, compared with 27.1% nationally.

Although some people chose not to answer the census's question about religious affiliation, 57.5% had no religion, 30.7% were Christian, 0.3% had Māori religious beliefs, 1.1% were Hindu, 1.1% were Muslim, 0.8% were Buddhist and 2.1% had other religions.

Of those at least 15 years old, 489 (27.8%) people had a bachelor's or higher degree, and 210 (11.9%) people had no formal qualifications. The median income was $42,300, compared with $31,800 nationally. 495 people (28.1%) earned over $70,000 compared to 17.2% nationally. The employment status of those at least 15 was that 957 (54.3%) people were employed full-time, 282 (16.0%) were part-time, and 45 (2.6%) were unemployed.

Community facilities
Community facilities include a fire station, community hall, play centre, library, café and hotel.

Tourism
The nearby Arataki Visitor Centre proves information about the local flora, fauna and geology, and is the starting point for a number of well-maintained walking trails.

Tramping
The Waiatarua area includes the Upper and Lower Nihotupu water reservoirs. Leading to these reservoirs are scenic walking trails through native forest past waterfalls. These trails connect with the wider network of walking trails within Waitakere Regional Park. Many other tramping tracks are in the area. The nearest centres to Waiatarua are Titirangi village, Swanson, and the Henderson Valley.

Education
The local state primary schools are Oratia School and Henderson Valley School. The local state secondary schools are Kelston Boys High School and Kelston Girls' College. Catholic students usually attend St Dominic's College in Henderson (girls), Liston College in Henderson (boys) or commute by train from Henderson to Marist College in Mount Albert (girls) or St Peter's College in Grafton (boys). School buses departing from nearby Titirangi village service schools in central Auckland including Epsom Girls' Grammar School, St Cuthbert's College, Auckland and Diocesan School for Girls, Auckland.

Radio and television mast
A transmission mast is located in the area.  The Freeview UHF terrestrial service is transmitted to many areas in Auckland.  A transmitter for Kordia's Digital Audio Broadcasting (DAB) trial is also located here.  FM radio services used to be transmitted but these were transferred to the Auckland Sky Tower.

See also
 New Zealand masts

References

Populated places in the Auckland Region
Waitākere Ranges Local Board Area
Waitākere Ranges
West Auckland, New Zealand